Syzygium fibrosum is a species of rainforest trees native to monsoon forests of Indonesia, Papua New Guinea, and Australia. Common names include small red apple, (Bamaga) fibrous satinash and apricot satinash.

Leaves are opposite, smooth, leathery, elliptic, 5.5–11 cm long and 3.5–55 cm wide.  The flowers are cream with numerous stamens. The pink or red fruit has a flattened globular shape and are about 2 cm wide, containing a singular seed.

Uses
The tree is cultivated to a limited extent for its sour fruit, which are used in jams and confectionery.

References

Bushfood
Crops originating from Australia
fibrosum
Myrtales of Australia
Flora of Queensland